Voorting is a surname. Notable people with the surname include:

Adrie Voorting (1931–1961), Dutch cyclist, brother of Gerrit
Gerrit Voorting (1923–2015), Dutch cyclist

Dutch-language surnames